Van Cleave (born Nathan Lang Van Cleave, May 8, 1910 – July 3, 1970) was a composer and orchestrator for film, television, and radio.

Biography 

Born in Bayfield, Wisconsin, he played with big bands, including Doc Fenton and his Sooners and Al Katz and his Kittens. He moved to New York City where he led his own band (the Van Cleave Orchestra) in the early 1930s, then played trumpet and arranged music for Charlie Barnet's orchestra.

In 1933, he married Doris Blumenfeld, a Broadway chorus girl and the child of vaudeville actors of the German Blumenfeld circus family.

He studied music with noted composer and music theorist Joseph Schillinger.  He worked in radio, as a staff arranger for Paul Whiteman (1938–39), Andre Kostelanetz, Fred Waring, and for CBS Radio.

He invented new record needles with improved sound, and founded the Duotone company, which manufactured needles.

In 1945, Van Cleave moved to Los Angeles to pursue his musical career.  His film credits, as composer and orchestrator, include Cinerama Holiday, The Colossus of New York, Easter Parade, Funny Face, Robinson Crusoe on Mars, In Search of the Castaways and White Christmas. He composed the VistaVision Fanfare to accompany the opening of theatre curtains to the wide screen format. In addition, he worked on many TV episodes of Gunsmoke and The Twilight Zone, where he pioneered the use of the theremin in television scores.

In the Gunsmoke episode "The Quest for Asa Janin," the last episode of season 8, from June 1963, with music by Van Cleave, the five-note main theme used throughout 1964's Robinson Crusoe on Mars can be heard several times.

References

External links 

Nathan Van Cleave at Soundtrack, the Cinemascore & Soundtrack Archives. Retrieved 19 September 2014.
 "VistaVision Fanfare" Score at the University of Wyoming. American Heritage Center. Nathan Van Cleave papers. 

1970 deaths
1910 births
People from Bayfield, Wisconsin
American bandleaders
American television composers
American film score composers
American male film score composers
American music arrangers
20th-century American composers
Musicians from Wisconsin
20th-century American male musicians